Gustavo Atilano Florentín Morínigo (born 30 June 1978) is a Paraguayan football manager and former player who played as a defender. He is the current manager of Sportivo Luqueño.

Playing career
Born in San Antonio, Florentín started playing for Paraguarí-based side Sud América before joining Cerro Porteño in 1996. He rarely settled for a club during his career, representing local sides 12 de Octubre, Sportivo San Lorenzo, Colegiales, Recoleta, Sol de América, Sportivo Luqueño, Fernando de la Mora, Guaraní and Tacuary. He also spent a short time abroad in 2003, representing Romanian side Farul Constanța.

At the international level, Florentín played for the under-20 national team in the 1997 FIFA World Youth Championship in Malaysia.

Managerial career
After retiring, Florentin began coaching in 2009 with Cerro Porteño, being in charge of their youth categories. In 2013, he became the main squad's assistant manager, and was also an interim manager in November 2015 after Roberto Torres left.

Florentín returned to his previous duties after the appointment of César Farías, but was named manager in July 2016 after Gustavo Morínigo was sacked. On 6 March of the following year, he was himself dismissed.

On 11 September 2017, Florentín was appointed manager of Deportivo Capiatá also in the Primera División. He resigned the following 27 May, and took over fellow league team Sportivo Luqueño on 9 June.

On 10 September 2018, Florentín left Luqueño to take over Guaraní. He left the club on a mutual consent on 29 May of the following year, and was appointed in charge of Chilean Primera División side Huachipato on 11 July.

In December 2020, Florentín was hugely criticized after his post-match comments related to substituting off Antonio Castillo in the first-half of a 2–2 home draw against Colo Colo, where he stated that "if a footballer is not brave, he is not in the right occupation". He was sacked by Huachipato on 6 January 2021. 

Florentín returned to his home country on 17 February 2021, to manage Sol de América. He opted to leave the latter on 23 March 2021, and was presented at the helm of The Strongest on 26 April.

On 15 August 2021, Florentín resigned from the Tigre, and switched teams and countries again eleven days later after taking over Campeonato Brasileiro Série A side Sport Recife. Despite suffering relegation, he was kept as manager for the 2022 season, but was sacked nonetheless on 3 March of that year.

On 8 August 2022, Florentín was presented as manager of General Caballero JLM in his home country, but resigned on 16 September. On 27 October, he took over Sportivo Luqueño, newly-promoted to the top tier.

Managerial statistics

Honours

Manager
Guaraní
Copa Paraguay: 2018

References

External links

1978 births
Living people
Paraguayan footballers
Association football defenders
Cerro Porteño players
12 de Octubre Football Club players
Colegiales footballers
Club Sol de América footballers
Sportivo Luqueño players
Fernando de la Mora footballers
Club Guaraní players
Club Tacuary footballers
FCV Farul Constanța players
Paraguayan expatriate footballers
Paraguayan expatriate sportspeople in Romania
Expatriate football managers in Romania
Paraguayan football managers
Cerro Porteño managers
Deportivo Capiatá managers
Club Guaraní managers
Huachipato managers
Club Sol de América managers
The Strongest managers
Sport Club do Recife managers
Club General Caballero (Juan León Mallorquín) managers
Sportivo Luqueño managers
Paraguayan expatriate football managers
Paraguayan expatriate sportspeople in Chile
Paraguayan expatriate sportspeople in Bolivia
Paraguayan expatriate sportspeople in Brazil
Expatriate football managers in Chile
Expatriate football managers in Bolivia
Expatriate football managers in Brazil